Reppert is a surname. Notable people with the surname include:

Howard Reppert (1918–1989), American businessman and politician
Elsa 'Jack' von Reppert-Bismarck (1903–1971), German painter
Scott Reppert (born 1960), American football player
Steven M. Reppert (born 1946), American neuroscientist 
Victor Reppert (born 1953), American philosopher
   
See also
Reppert-Gabler House (also known as Building 314A), is a historic home located at Monongahela Township in Greene County, Pennsylvania
Reppert School of Auctioneering, Auction school in Indianapolis

References